St Patrick's College is an independent Catholic primary and secondary day school for boys, located on the waterfront in Shorncliffe, north of Brisbane, in Queensland, Australia. Established by the Congregation of Christian Brothers in 1952, the college currently enrols approximately 1,400 students across eight grades (Years 5 to 12).

History

1800s 
In 1862, John McConnel, a pastoralist and member of the Queensland Legislative Council, began construction on a house for his family on Park Parade. McConnel commissioned Benjamin Backhouse, another politician at the time, and his architectural firm to design the property; a single-story timber house facing the waterfront. By 1864, construction was complete. A number of other properties under McConnel's name during the 1870s were built, including the Seaview Hotel built on Kate Street (now Pier Avenue) and Holland House, a boarding home.

In 1879, Moses Ward, a land speculator and chairman of the Redcliffe and Sandgate Steam Ferry Company, purchased the property. Ward sold the property the following year to David Brown of the firm Thomas Brown and Sons located in inner-city Brisbane. The property was named “Morven” after Brown's homeland in Scotland and is still known by that name today. In 1886, architect F.D.G. Stanley renovated the property to a Georgian, two-story mansion and in 1891, further work was performed by the architectural firm Oakden, Addison and Kemp.

Due to the waterfront views the building provides and its lavish upgrade, Morven became a popular residence for Brisbane's wealthy, including the likes of Queensland Governor Henry Wylie Norman.

1900s 

In 1910, Edward Goddard Blume purchased Morven and in the following years it was run as a guesthouse by Blume's sister-in-law and her daughters. In 1943, Blume passed away and the property became derelict. Morven was commonly referred to as a 'haunted house' by locals and was in complete disuse until 1947 where the evangelical Christian movement known for their beach missions, Children's Special Service Mission, made use of the run-down property.

In 1951, the dilapidated Morven building was purchased by the parish priest of Sandgate, Father Patrick O’Rourke, in order to build a Catholic boys' school due to overcrowding at Sacred Heart, a local convent school. St Patrick’s College commenced on 29 January 1952 with Brother Coffey as the principal and 172 enrolled students.

On 22 October 1988, Tony Fitzgerald, an old boy of SPC, talked at a speech night at the school in his first public outing since his appointment as chair of the Fitzgerald Inquiry. The speech focused on the youth and their role in the challenges the inquiry brought to light, saying "the solutions to the problems with which my inquiry is concerned lie with us collectively, with our attitudes and behaviour as a community".

More facilities were built over the decades to accommodate the growing student body, including a tuckshop in 1958, a swimming pool in 1972, and a middle school building for Years 5-6 in 1977 (called the Morrissey Building). In 1992, the school's main sporting fields were built on top of an old rubbish dump on Curlew Street in Sandgate, becoming known as Curlew Park.

2000s

Heritage listing of Morven 
In 2004, the Christian Brother's stopped residing in the college after 52 years of living within Morven. It was declared a local heritage place that same year due to its historical and social significance. The building now contains offices for teachers and the administration office.

2010 stabbing of school student 
On 15 February 2010, twelve-year-old Elliot Fletcher was stabbed in the school's bathroom by a thirteen-year-old classmate before dying shortly upon arrival at hospital. Media reports claimed the alleged offender was a victim of bullying at the school who stabbed Elliot using a knife intended to "scare" his tormentors. After fleeing the school grounds, the attacker was found with minor wounds and taken to hospital by police; he was charged with murder the same day.

A Facebook memorial page was created following the tragedy, seeing hundreds of people paying tribute to Elliot. After a number of graphic images were put up in an effort to vandalise the tribute page, Queensland Police launched an investigation and, in the following months, the man responsible for the defacement was charged with child exploitation offenses.

Elliot's funeral was attended by thousands of mourners, including hundreds of fellow students who formed a guard of honour around the hearse to pay tribute.

Culture
On Monday the 17th of October 2022, the Pi challenge and Spelling Bee was held in the Christian Brothers Building. The infamous Don Alabata managed to earn himself a place in the competition, but lost his victory to Joel Phillip the 2022 Spelling Bee champion. The Pi Challenge was another key event during this assembly. A year 11 boy with the highest predicted Atar and straight A's across all subjects managed to lose the pi challenge to a year 7 student. His incompetence in this challenge was unacceptable for his intelligence. Joel Phillip broke the school record for the highest number of digits recited, with an outstanding 417 compared to Lachlan Silver-Thomas' measely 97 digits.

Sport
St Patrick's College is one of eight member schools of the Associated Independent Colleges (AIC) and participates in that association's sporting competitions for high school students and junior school students. The college has had success in AIC, winning four aggregate cross country championships (2011, 2012, 2013, 2014), two First XI cricket premierships (2018, 2020) and two First XI football premierships (2013, 2015).

AIC premierships 
St Patrick's College has won the following AIC premierships.

 Australian Football - 2020
 Basketball - 2015
 Chess - 2020
 Cricket (2) - 2018, 2020
 Cross Country (4) - 2011, 2012, 2013, 2014
 Golf - 2014
 Rugby Union - 2018
 Rugby League - 2021
 Soccer (2) - 2013, 2015
 Tennis - 2006
 Volleyball - 2015

Non AIC sports 
College esports competitions were first officially started in 2022, with the college's participation in the Australian Esports League and Acer High Schools Cup's annual Rocket League competition marking the very first time the school would recognise gaming as a sport.  This would lead to St Patrick's College earning a spot in the league's Hall of Fame after winning the Term 3 2022 Rocket League championship.  There was also a separate AIC esports competition in Minecraft 5v5 Capture the Flag.

Culture 
St Patrick's College offers a number of cultural programs, including:

 Instrumental and Vocal Music - there are over 20 school ensembles ranging from percussion to jazz performing at the school and other events such as the QCMF.
 Chess
 Debating 
 Theatresports 
 Art Club
 Film Crew (and Junior Film Crew)
 School Musical
 Senior Drama Production
 Tech Crew
 Dance Crew

The college stages biannual senior and junior musicals with another Catholic secondary school, St John Fisher College and in collaboration with local community theatre company Brisbane Junior Theatre. The most recent senior school musicals were Popstars (2015), High School Musical (2017), Grease (2019), and The Addams Family (2021). The next production with St John Fisher College in 2023 is Shrek The Musical. The college also staged an original senior drama production based on the local legend of "The Ghost of Morven" in celebration of their 70th anniversary.  The students of the college also organise a yearly "Showcase" event where each house competes in a battle of stage performance.

House system
There are nine houses at St Patrick's College: 

 Coffey (blue) - named after Brother Coffey, the first principal of the college from 1952 to 1957
 Kennedy (purple) - named after John J. Kennedy, principal of the college from 1995 to 1999
 Mooney (green) - named after Brother Mooney, principal of the college from 1966 to 1971
 O'Rourke (yellow) - named after Father Patrick O'Rourke, the school's founder
 Quane (red) - named after Brother Quane, principal of the college from 1964 to 1965
 Rice (orange) - named after Edmund Ignatius Rice, the catholic missionary who founded the Congregation of Christian Brothers
 Ryan (white) - named after Brother Ryan, principal of the college from 1972 to 1977
 Treacy (teal) - named after Brother Patrick Ambrose Treacy, a prominent Christian Brother in the congregation
 Xavier (maroon) - named after St Francis Xavier, the patron saint of Roman Catholic missions

Notable alumni
Alumni of St Patrick’s College are called Old Boys and can join the St Patrick’s Old Boys' Association (SPCOBA). Some notable Old Boys are:
 Jayson Bukuya – former rugby league footballer; represented the Cronulla Sharks, the New Zealand Warriors, and Fiji's national team
 Joseph Champness – footballer for the New Zealand national team and professional rapper JOWIC
 Michael Crocker – former Australian rugby league footballer; represented Queensland and the Australian Kangaroos
 Lolo Fakaosilea – rugby union footballer for the Kintetsu Liners
 Justice Tony Fitzgerald – former Australian judge; chaired Queensland's anti-corruption inquiry in the late 1980s Fitzgerald Inquiry and several other inquiries
 Drew Mitchell – former Australian rugby union footballer; represented the Queensland Reds, the Waratahs, and Australia's national team
 Jesse Mogg – Australian rugby union footballer for the ACT Brumbies
 Dylan Napa – rugby league footballer for the Catalans Dragons
 Jeral Skelton – Australian rugby league footballer for the Canterbury Bulldogs
 Ryan Smith – Australian rugby union footballer for the Queensland Reds
 Cheynee Stiller – former Australian rules footballer; represented the Brisbane Lions
 Corey Wagner – Australian rules footballer
 Josh Wagner – former Australian rules footballer
 Adam White – Australian volleyball player; represented Australia's national team and competed in the 2012 Summer Olympics
 Brendan Whitecross – former Australian rules footballer; represented the Hawthorn Hawks
 Matthew Lydement – Australian weightlifter; competed in the 2020 Summer Olympics
 Brendan Creevey – former Australian cricketer; represented Queensland
 Bryan Roe – Australian priest and former professional tennis player

See also

 Catholic education in Australia
 List of schools in Queensland
 List of Christian Brothers schools

References

External links
St. Patrick's College website
Private Schools Guide

Congregation of Christian Brothers secondary schools in Australia
Educational institutions established in 1952
Boys' schools in Queensland
Catholic secondary schools in Brisbane
Congregation of Christian Brothers primary schools in Australia
1952 establishments in Australia